The National Administration of State Secret Protection of the People's Republic of China is an institution of the State Council of the People's Republic of China that is responsible for the protection of classified information. The name was translated as National Administration for the Protection of State Secrets.

It is also the Office of the Central Secrecy Commission, a subordinate organization of the General Office of the Central Committee of the Chinese Communist Party.

Overview 

The Criminal Law of the People's Republic of China (which is not operative in the Special Administrative Regions of Hong Kong and Macao) makes it a crime to release a state secret. Under the 1989 "Law on Guarding State Secrets," state secrets are defined as those that concern: 
 Major policy decisions on state affairs;
 The building of national defence and in the activities of the armed forces;
 Diplomatic activities and in activities related to foreign countries and those to be maintained as commitments to foreign countries;
 National economic and social development;
 Science and technology;
 Activities for preserving state security and the investigation of criminal offences; and
 Any other matters classified as "state secrets" by the national State Secrets Bureau.

Secrets can be classified into one of three categories: 
 Top secret: Defined as "vital state secrets whose disclosure would cause extremely serious harm to state security and national interests"; 
 Highly secret: Defined as "important state secrets whose disclosure would cause serious harm to state security and national interests"; and 
 Secret: Defined as "ordinary state secrets whose disclosure would cause harm to state security and national interests".

References 

Government agencies of China
National security institutions